Cryptocheiridium elegans is a species of pseudoscorpions in the family Cheiridiidae. It is found in Cuba.

References 

 Kůrka A. (2007): České názvy živočichů VI. Pavoukovci (Arachnida). IV. Bičovci (Amblypygi), Štírenky (Palpigradi), Štírci (Pseudosciorpiones), Roztočovci (Ricinulei), Krátkochvosti (Schizomida), Solifugy (Solifugae), Bičnatci (Uropygi), Národní muzeum (zoologické oddělení PM), Praha, 128 pp

External links 

 Cryptocheiridium elegans at Biolib

Cheiridiidae
Animals described in 1981
Fauna of Cuba